Katy Bell or Katie Bell may refer to:

Katie Bell (diver) (born 1988), American diver
Katie Bell, a character from the Harry Potter novel series, portrayed by Georgina Leonidas in the films
"Katy Bell", song on More Than Ever (Blood, Sweat & Tears album)
Katy Bell, character in UK TV series Steel River Blues
Katie Bell, a soccer player for the Real Colorado Cougars

See also
Kate Bell (disambiguation)
Catherine Bell (disambiguation)
Katherine Bell (disambiguation)